Kučín is a village and municipality in Bardejov District in the Prešov Region of north-east Slovakia.

History
In historical records the village was first mentioned in 1335.

Geography
The municipality lies at an altitude of 124 metres and covers an area of 7.193 km².
It has a population of about 316 people.

External links
 
https://web.archive.org/web/20070513023228/http://www.statistics.sk/mosmis/eng/run.html

Villages and municipalities in Bardejov District
Šariš